Springfield was a provincial electoral division in the Canadian province of Manitoba. It was created by the province's first electoral redistribution in 1874 and existed until 2011, except for the period from 1914 to 1920.

Springfield was located to the immediate east of the City of Winnipeg. It was bordered to the north by Selkirk and Gimli, to the east by Lac Du Bonnet and to the south by La Verendrye. The riding included the municipalities of Springfield and East St. Paul, as well as Anola, Dugald, Birds Hill and Oakbank. Before 1989, the riding stretched as far as the Ontario border.

The riding's population in 1996 was 18,599. In 1999, the average family income was $67,794, and the unemployment rate was 4.50%. Manufacturing accounted for 12% of all industry in the riding, followed by 11% in the service sector. Springfield had significant Ukrainian and German populations, at 9% and 8% respectively.

Springfield was represented by various political parties over its long history, without any one party dominating for an extended period of time. This pattern hd begun to change, as the riding had been represented by the Progressive Conservatives since 1990, and the last member, Member of the Legislative Assembly, Ron Schuler, was re-elected with over 60% of the vote in 2003.  The seat was considered safe for the Progressive Conservatives.

Following the 2008 electoral redistribution, the riding was dissolved into La Verendrye and the new riding of St. Paul. This took effect for the 2011 election.

List of provincial representatives

Electoral results

1874 general election

1878 general election

1879 general election

1882 by-election

1883 general election

1886 general election

1888 general election

1892 general election

1896 general election

1899 general election

1903 general election

1907 general election

1910 general election

1920 general election

1922 general election

1927 general election

1932 general election

1936 general election

1941 general election

1945 general election

1949 general election

1953 general election

1958 general election

1959 general election

1962 general election

1966 general election

1969 general election

1973 general election

1977 general election

1981 general election

1986 general election

1988 general election

1990 general election

1995 general election

1999 general election

2003 general election

2007 general election

References

Former provincial electoral districts of Manitoba